HMS Trafalgar was ordered as a 98-gun second-rate ship of the line, re-rated as a 106-gun first-rate ship of the line whose keel was laid in 1813 and which was launched on 26 July 1820 at Chatham. She was designed by the Surveyors of the Navy (including William Rule), and was the only ship built to her draught.

She was renamed HMS Camperdown on 22 February 1825.

Camperdown was placed on harbour service as a guard ship at Portsmouth in 1854 and became a coal hulk (acting as a floating depot) at Portsmouth in 1860 and remained there thereafter. 

She cannot have been the hulk referred to in the unpublished diary of Col. Archibald Butter (1857) as lying in Simons Bay, near Cape Town, South Africa: 'The Camperdown a hulk is kept as a store ship'.  She was renamed HMS Pitt on 29 July 1882 and was sold out of the Navy in May 1906 and was broken up at Charlton.

Notes

References

 Lavery, Brian (2003) The Ship of the Line - Volume 1: The development of the battlefleet 1650–1850. Conway Maritime Press. .
 
 Winfield, Rif (2005) British Warships in the Age of Sail 1793 - 1817. Seaforth Publishing. .

External links
 
3-Decks Naval history site Page on the Trafalgar

Ships of the line of the Royal Navy
Ships built in Chatham
Coal hulks
1820 ships